Blanca (aft. 1133, Laguardia, Álava – August 12, 1156) was Queen of Castile, daughter of King García Ramírez of Navarre and his first wife, Margaret of L'Aigle. Blanca married Sancho III of Castile, regent of Castile (subject to his father Alfonso VII) on February 4, 1151 in Carrión de los Condes, Palencia, after travelling from Calahorra, Logroño, in January. The marriage was arranged to insure closer ties between León-Castile and Navarre. As was traditional, Blanca confirmed documents with her husband, so her activity may be traced until 1155. 

On November 11, 1155 she gave birth to the future king Alfonso VIII. There appears to be no record of her activities after December 1155, and she died on August 12, 1156. The cause of her death seems to have been complications of a new pregnancy, a child named García. In addition, she had other children buried in the church of San Pedro in Soria, although they are not identified.

That her death was caused by a pregnancy is recorded in an epitaph engraved on her tomb; however, the engraving did not survive a sixteenth-century reconstruction of the royal tombs in Nájera. Her sarcophagus lid was preserved, and it represents the queen's deathbed with members of the court, including her husband, mourning her passing. Blanca was buried in the pantheon of the Navarrese kings in the monastery called Santa María la Real of Nájera, to which Sancho made donations on her behalf. The sarcophagus of the queen is regarded as a primary example of the ability to express human emotions in visual images in the 12th century.

References

1130s births
1156 deaths
12th-century nobility from León and Castile
Deaths in childbirth
Navarrese infantas
Castilian queen consorts
Daughters of kings